Dejan Mileusnić (born 16 November 1991 in Zenica) is a Bosnian athlete specialising in the javelin throw. He won a bronze medal at the 2017 Mediterranean Games.

His personal best in the event is 81.63 metres set in Zenica in 2016. This is the current Bosnia and Herzegovina record.

International competitions

References

1990 births
Living people
Bosnia and Herzegovina male javelin throwers
Athletes (track and field) at the 2015 European Games
Sportspeople from Zenica
Mediterranean Games bronze medalists for Bosnia and Herzegovina
Mediterranean Games medalists in athletics
Athletes (track and field) at the 2013 Mediterranean Games
Athletes (track and field) at the 2018 Mediterranean Games
Athletes (track and field) at the 2022 Mediterranean Games